is a railway station on the Kyūdai Main Line operated by JR Kyushu in Kurume, Fukuoka Prefecture, Japan. Tanushimaru is noted for having a section of the station building specially shaped to resemble the head and beak of a Kappa, an aquatic Yokai which is associated with the town.

Lines 
Only local trains on the line stop at the station.

Layout 
The station consists of two side platforms serving two tracks at grade. A siding branches off track 1. The station shares a building with a local tourism association and information centre. The tourism association also acts as a kan'i itaku agent and manages the ticket window which is equipped with a POS machine but does not have a Midori no Madoguchi facility. Access to the opposite side platform is by means of a footbridge. A bike shed is located at the station forecourt.

History
Tanushimaru was opened on the same day as one of several intermediate stations on the track. With the privatization of Japanese National Railways (JNR), the successor of JGR, on 1 April 1987, JR Kyushu took over control of the station.

Passenger statistics
In fiscal 2016, the station was used by an average of 600 passengers daily (boarding passengers only), and it ranked 226th among the busiest stations of JR Kyushu.

References

External links
Tanushimaru (JR Kyushu)

Railway stations in Fukuoka Prefecture
Railway stations in Japan opened in 1928